Ian Wilson (born 1941) is a prolific author of historical and religious books. He has investigated such topics as the Shroud of Turin and life after death.

Life
He was born in Clapham, south London, during World War II. Neither of his parents was religious. His school was nominally Church of England, but during scripture classes he was always, as he put it, "the number one sceptic". He graduated in Modern History from Magdalen College, Oxford in 1963.

He first came across the Shroud during the 1950s, when he was in his mid-teens, in an illustrated article by World War II hero Group Captain Leonard Cheshire. It was the famous image on the negative of the Shroud that dealt the first blow to his formerly complacent agnosticism. In 1972 he converted to Roman Catholicism.

Wilson is most well known for his research on Shroud of Turin. In a piece for the journal Free Inquiry, historian Charles Freeman heavily criticized Wilson's writings on the subject, commenting "He is not taken seriously by any respected historian... Wilson has failed to provide any significant evidence from this mass of material to back his narrative. It seems to fail at every point. He provides no evidence that the Shroud existed in Jerusalem, no evidence that a burial shroud arrived in Edessa."

He participated in Channel 4's three part TV series Jesus: The Evidence (1984) and wrote the accompanying book of the same name.  The series proved to be highly controversial and sparked a national furore, marking a significant moment in the changing fortunes of religious broadcasting in the UK.

He lived in Bristol, England, for twenty-six years and now resides in Brisbane, Australia, with his wife, Judith. They have two sons, Adrian and Noel.

Publications
The Turin Shroud: The Burial Cloth of Jesus Christ?, 1979 
Mind Out of Time?: Reincarnation Claims Investigated, 1981
All in the Mind: Reincarnation, Hypnotic Regression, Stigmata, Multiple Personality, and Other Little-understood Powers of the Mind, 1982
Reincarnation?: The Claims Investigated, 1982
Jesus: The Evidence, Weidenfeld & Nicolson, 1984 
The Exodus Enigma, 1985 
The Evidence of the Shroud, 1986
Undiscovered: The Fascinating World of Undiscovered Places, Graves, Wrecks and Treasure, 1987
The After Death Experience: The Physics of the Non-Physical, 1987 
The Bleeding Mind: An Investigation Into the Mysterious Phenomenon of Stigmata, 1988
Stigmata: An Investigation into the Mysterious Appearance of Christ's Wounds in Hundreds of People from Medieval Italy to Modern America, 1989
Superself: The Hidden Powers Within Us, 1989 
Holy Faces, Secret Places: An Amazing Quest for the Face of Jesus, 1991  
The Columbus Myth: Did Men of Bristol Reach America Before Columbus?, 1992
Shakespeare: The Evidence : Unlocking the Mysteries of the Man and His Work, 1994
In Search of Ghosts, 1995
Jesus: The Evidence, 2nd ed., London: Weidenfeld & Nicolson, 1996. ; San Francisco: HarperSanFrancisco, 1997. 
The Blood and the Shroud: New Evidence That the World's Most Sacred Relic Is Real, 1998  
Life After Death: The Evidence, 1998
The Bible As History, Weidenfeld & Nicolson, 1999 
The Turin Shroud: Unshrouding the Mystery, 2000  
Before the Flood: The Biblical Flood as a Real Event and How It Changed the Course of Civilization, 2002 
John Cabot and the Matthew, 2003  
Nostradamus the Man Behind the Prophecies, 2003 
Lost World of the Kimberley: Extraordinary New Glimpses of Australia's Ice Age Ancestors, 2006  
Murder at Golgotha: A Scientific Investigation into the Last Days of Jesus's Life, His Death, and His Resurrection, 2007 
The Shroud: The 2000-Year-Old Mystery Solved, 2010  (also known as The Shroud: Fresh Light on the 2000-Year-Old Mystery, 2010 )
The Book of Geoffroi De Charny with the Livre Charny edited and translated by Nigel Bryant, 2021 

Book reviews
"Before the Flood". Kirkus Reviews.
"Mind Out of Time?". New Scientist.
"Nostradamus: The Man Behind the Prophecies". Publishers Weekly.
"Reincarnation Cases". The Tablet.
"The After Death Experience". Kirkus Reviews.
"The Blood and the Shroud". Publishers Weekly.

References

1941 births
Living people
Alumni of Magdalen College, Oxford
British writers
Converts to Roman Catholicism from atheism or agnosticism
People from Clapham
Researchers of the Shroud of Turin
Roman Catholic writers